Clube Desportivo do Exército or simply Exército is an Angolan semi-professional club based in Luanda. The club's handball team competes at the local level, at the Luanda Provincial Handball Championship and at the Angola Men's Handball League.

Honours

National Championship:
Winner (0): 
 Runner Up (0) :

Angola Cup:
Winner (0): 
 Runner Up (0) :

Angola Super Cup:
Winner (0): 
 Runner Up (0) :

Squad

See also
Federação Angolana de Andebol

References

Sports clubs in Angola
Angolan handball clubs